The Delia Austrian Medal, also known as the Distinguished Performance Award, is a theater award presented annually since 1935 by The Drama League for the "most distinguished" performance of the theater season. The award is named for theater reviewer Delia Austrian.

Winners

Footnotes

External links
Awards History at Drama League of New York

American theater awards